Tsaghkashen, until 1950 known as Takyarlu and Takiarli, is a village in the Aparan Municipality of the Aragatsotn Province of Armenia. It is located in the Aparan district.

References 

Populated places in Aragatsotn Province